Eschenbach is German surname.  Notable people with the surname include:

 Wolfram von Eschenbach (c. 1160–1220), German knight, poet and Minnesinger
 Marie von Ebner-Eschenbach (1830–1916), Austrian writer
 Christoph Eschenbach (b. 1940), German pianist and conductor
 Andrew von Eschenbach, former Director of the U.S. National Cancer Institute, Commissioner of the U.S. Food and Drug Administration (FDA) from 2006 to 2009, Director at BioTime, 2011–present

See also
Eschenbach (disambiguation)

German-language surnames
German toponymic surnames

de:Eschenbach
es:Eschenbach
eo:Eschenbach
fr:Eschenbach
it:Eschenbach
nl:Eschenbach
ja:エッシェンバッハ
pt:Eschenbach
ro:Eschenbach
ru:Эшенбах
sv:Eschenbach
vo:Eschenbach